Margaret Macadam (1902–1991) was a British illustrator active in the 1920s and 1930s. In 1925 she won a scholarship to the Royal Academy Schools where a fellow student and future sister-in-law was Amy Elton. Among her commercial works are several dust wrapper designs for London-based publishers, most important among which is the design for the dust wrapper for the first edition of Agatha Christie's first straight novel Giant's Bread. Following the discovery of an archive of Macadam's work in 2016 it was possible to connect her work on Giant's Bread to other known designs. The original artwork for Giant's Bread was sold for £550 in 2016. She is also known to have designed wallpaper, and greetings cards for Medici, London. Other work is known, such as 1933.  In May 1936 she married Francis Beart, already well-known as a racing motor cyclist and motor cycle tuner, and later also for tuning Formula Three racing cars. During World War II she trained as a nurse in the Voluntary Aid Detachment (VAD) while her husband worked as an engineer for the Bristol Aeroplane Company.

Book dust wrapper designs
Among her known works are:

 Giant's Bread by Mary Westmacott, a nom-de-plume of Agatha Christie (1930) William Collins, Sons - 'Collins', London - first edition.
 Water into Wine by Catherine Cotton (1930) Collins, London - dust wrapper for overseas edition.
 This Siren Song by Ernest Elmore (1930) Collins, London - dust wrapper for first edition. 
 Living One's Life by Evelyn Pember (1932) Collins, London - dust wrapper for first edition.
 Joseph Kerkhoven's Third Existence by Jacob Wassermann (1934) Allen & Unwin, London - dust wrapper for first UK edition.
 Blind Mouths by Thomas Frederic Tweed (1934) Arthur Barker, London - dust wrapper for first edition.
 Neighbours by George Thomas (1935) Williams & Norgate, Ltd., London - dust wrapper for first edition.
 The Barbarians by Virginia Faulkner (1935) Arthur Barker, London - dust wrapper for first edition.
 Humour by Stephen Leacock (1935) The Bodley Head, London - dust wrapper for first edition.

Not all her dust wrappers are signed, but those for Water into Wine, Joseph Kerkhoven's Third Existence, Blind Mouths, Neighbours, The Barbarians and Humour are.

References

20th-century British artists
British illustrators
1902 births
1991 deaths